Rotherham County F.C. was an English football club based in Rotherham, South Yorkshire. They spent a number of years in the English Football League before merging with rivals Rotherham Town in 1925 to form Rotherham United.

History
The club was founded in 1877, as Thornhill Football Club (later 'Thornhill United'), before, in 1905, changing to Rotherham County. It joined the Midland League in 1903, and stayed in that competition until it was abandoned for World War I. They won the Midland League title for four consecutive seasons, from 1911–12 to 1914–15 inclusive.

After the War, they were elected to the Football League when the league expanded from 40 clubs to 44 in 1919. In 1925 they merged with local rivals Rotherham Town to form Rotherham United who are still members of the Football League.

Notable former players
Players that played in the English Football League with Rotherham County –

 John Ackroyd
 Arthur Beachill
 George Bertram
 Jackie Bestall
 William Birch
 Thomas Birtles
 John Bramley
 Philip Bratley
 Jimmy Broadhead
 Frank Brown
 Robert George Brown
 Billy Clarkson
 George Cook
 Harry Draper
 Billy Easton
 Charles Elliott
 Reuben Grice
 Tommy Hakin
 John Hammerton
 Howard Humphries
 Richard Jackson
 Jack Lambert
 Joe Lees
 James Lofthouse
 Percy Mackrill
 Jack Manning
 Ernest Milton
 John Murphy
 Billy Palmer
 Albert Pape
 George Reid
 Archie Roe
 Joe Scott
 George Simpson
 George Stacey
 George Thompson
 Joey Williams

League and cup history

Honours

League
Midland League
Champions: 1911–12, 1912–13 1913–14, 1914–15

Cup
Sheffield & Hallamshire County Cup
Winners: 1922–23
Runners-up: 1924–25
Sheffield & Hallamshire Senior Cup
Winners: 1912–13, 1913–14
Runners-up: 1908–09

Records
Best league performance: 16th, Football League Division 2, 1921–22
Best FA Cup performance: 1st Round, 1922–23

References

 
Defunct football clubs in England
Association football clubs established in 1870
Association football clubs disestablished in 1925
Defunct English Football League clubs
Sport in Rotherham
Defunct football clubs in South Yorkshire
1870 establishments in England
1925 disestablishments in England
Midland Football League (1889)
Sheffield Association League
Hatchard League